Hannah Louise Keryakoplis (born 1 February 1994) is a Welsh footballer who plays for Derby County and the Wales women's national team as a striker. She has previously played for Liverpool, Stoke City and Birmingham City.

Club career
Keryakoplis was called into Liverpool Ladies' FA WSL squad for the 2012 season. She scored her first goal on 22 April 2012, in a 2–2 draw at Chelsea. Keryakoplis had made her first team debut during Liverpool's successful 2009–10 FA Women's Premier League Northern Division campaign.

In July 2013 she signed for FA Women's Premier League Northern Division newcomers Stoke City. Keryakoplis made just one appearance in the 2013 FA WSL season, as new signings including Natasha Dowie blocked her path to the first team. In January 2014 Keryakoplis returned to FA WSL level when she was signed by Birmingham City.

In July 2019, Hannah Keryakoplis signed for Derby County.

International career
After showing good form at Under–17 and Under–19 level, Keryakoplis made her senior Wales debut in October 2011, a 4–1 defeat to France in EURO 2013 qualifying.

International goals

Personal life
Keryakoplis is the great-granddaughter of the late England international footballer Tommy Gardner. She attended Castell Alun High School.

References

External links
Keryakoplis at UEFA
Keryakoplis at FAW
Keryakoplis at Liverpool Ladies

1994 births
Living people
Sportspeople from Flintshire
Liverpool F.C. Women players
Birmingham City W.F.C. players
Wales women's international footballers
FA Women's National League players
Women's Super League players
Stoke City L.F.C. players
Women's association football forwards
Welsh women's footballers
Derby County F.C. Women players